ADP-ribosyltransferase may refer to:
 NAD(P)(+)—protein-arginine ADP-ribosyltransferase, an enzyme
 NAD(+)—diphthamide ADP-ribosyltransferase, an enzyme
 Poly ADP ribose polymerase, an enzyme